This is a list of golf clubs that have been granted permission to bear the appellation of "Royal", having been bestowed by a reigning monarch, such as from British, Spanish, Belgian, Nepalese, Dutch, or Swedish monarchs. To receive the honour of "Royal", the golf club would normally invite a member of the Royal family to be a patron or an honorary member, or they apply for the title, which is granted from the reigning monarch. In Britain, according to Scott Macpherson in his book Golf's Royal Clubs Honoured by the British Royal Family 1833–2013, the title of "Royal" officially was restricted to ”institutions of eminence, long standing and secure financial position, and devoted to national, charitable and scientific objects” by the British monarchy.

Not all golf clubs that have "Royal" in their title have Royal status, for instance, the Royal Tara Golf Club in Ireland gave itself the title because the golf club is near the Hill of Tara where the ancient Kings of Ireland once resided. The Royal Spring Golf Course in India is called Royal Springs because there are four natural water springs that were used back by Mughal emperors, hence it is said to be "Royal". The Royal Links Golf in Las Vegas, USA, has no royal connects at all, it was built to acknowledge the traditions of the game. It features holes inspired by 11 different Open Championship courses, including the Old Course at St Andrews, Royal Liverpool, Hoylake, Royal Lytham & St Annes and Royal Birkdale. The Royal Automobile Club is a Royal club but not a Royal Golf Club, because the Royal Club just happens to have a golf course. King Edward VII granted the Royal status to the Automobile Club.

In Denmark, the Royal Golf Club in Copenhagen, also appears to have given itself the title of Royal when there is no evidence of any royal connections. Likewise the similarly named Royal Copenhagen Golf Club's only connection with royalty is that the national park, which today includes the golf club, was established by the Danish King Christian V in the late 17th century, and King Frederik III's castle sits near the 16th hole. The course is also located in Kongens Lyngby, Danish for "the King's Heather Town". There is no evidence to show that the golf course has been granted a charter or similar document.

Not all Royal golf clubs own their own golf course, the Royal Perth Golfing Society -the world's earliest 'royal' club  - play on the North Inch Golf Course, the Royal and Ancient Golf Club of St Andrews play on St Andrews Links, the Royal Montrose Mercantile Golf Club play on Montrose Links, and the Royal Epping Forest Golf Club play on Chingford Golf Course, which are all public golf courses.

Golf clubs granted Royal status by the British Monarchy

Golf clubs granted Royal status by the Spanish Monarchy

Golf clubs granted Royal status by the Belgian Monarchy

With some exceptions, Belgian golf clubs automatically adopt the title of Royal after they have been in operation for 50 years.

Golf clubs granted Royal status by other monarchies

See also
The R&A
List of yacht clubs granted Royal status

Notes

References

Further reading

External links

 'Royal' Golf Clubs (golftoday.co.uk)
 Location of 'Royal' golf clubs in the UK 

 
Royal status